Simyra nervosa is a moth of the family Noctuidae. In Europe, it is found from France, east through north and north-eastern Germany to Poland. South of the Alps it is found from northern Italy, through the Balkan countries to Greece. There is an isolated population in Sicily. In Asia, it is found in Anatolia, the Caucasus, Iran, Afghanistan, Sibiria, Tibet, Mongolia and China.

The wingspan is 28–34 mm. Adults are on wing in two generations from April to May and from July to August.

The larvae feed on Euphorbia esula, Rumex acetosella and Hieracium umbellatum.

References

External links 

 Fauna Europaea
 Lepiforum.de
  schmetterlinge-deutschlands

Simyra (moth)
Moths of Europe
Moths of Asia
Taxa named by Michael Denis
Taxa named by Ignaz Schiffermüller
Moths described in 1775